Caputia tomentosa, known as the woolly senecio and the matted caputia, is a perennial, succulent dwarf shrub of the Caputia genus that grows in the Cape Provinces of South Africa, usually between the altitudes of 900 and 1200 meters. It has been introduced to Myanmar. It has gained the Royal Horticultural Society's Award of Garden Merit as an ornamental.

History
Its first description was written by Adrian Hardy Haworth, in Miscellanea naturalia, 1803, p. 189, with the name of Cacalia tomentosa.
Haworth stated that he had received the plant, introduced eight years before, from the Stockwell Botanical Garden of his friend Benjamin Robertson.

Description
Growing up to 10–25 cm high, its leaves are densely felted, so much so that the felt can be stripped off, dried, and used as tinder. The plant is accordingly called "tontelbos" in Afrikaans. The word means "tinder bush". A plucked stem or leaf can be stuck into warm, not-too-dry earth, where it will root without special attention. Like most Richtersveld plants it does not do well in wet soil.

Gallery

Culture
Like in nature, Caputia tomentosa needs well-drained sandy loams, rare water and full sun.

References

External links

Senecioneae
Endemic flora of South Africa
Plants described in 2012
Garden plants